Zürich German (natively) is the High Alemannic dialect spoken in the Canton of Zürich, Switzerland.
Its area covers most of the canton, with the exception of the parts north of the Thur and the Rhine, which belong to the areal of the northeastern (Schaffhausen and Thurgau) Swiss dialects.

Zürich German was traditionally divided into six sub-dialects, now increasingly homogenised owing to larger commuting distances:
The dialect of the town of Zürich
The dialect spoken around Lake Zürich
The dialect of the Knonauer Amt west of the Albis
The dialect of the area of Winterthur
The dialect of the Zürcher Oberland around Lake Pfäffikon and the upper Tösstal valley
The dialect of the Zürcher Unterland around Bülach and Dielsdorf

Like all Swiss German dialects, it is essentially a spoken language, whereas the written language is standard German. Likewise, there is no official orthography of the Zürich dialect. When it is written, it rarely follows the guidelines published by Eugen Dieth in his book . Furthermore, Dieth's spelling uses a lot of diacritical marks not found on a normal keyboard. Young people often use Swiss German for personal messages, such as when texting with their mobile phones. As they do not have a standard way of writing they tend to blend Standard German spelling with Swiss German phrasing.

The Zürich dialect is generally perceived as fast spoken, less melodic than, for example, the Bernese. Characteristic of the city dialect is that it most easily adopts external influences; in particular, the second generation Italians (secondi) have had a crucial influence, as has the English language through the media. The wave of Turkish and ex-Yugoslavian immigration of the 1990s is leaving its imprint on the dialect of the city in particular.

Further reading 

  (proposed orthography)
 Salzmann, Martin: Resumptive Prolepsis: A study in indirect A'-dependencies. Utrecht: LOT, 2006 (=LOT Dissertation Series 136). Chapter 4: Resumptives in Zurich German relative clauses, online. 
 Weber, Albert: Zürichdeutsche Grammatik. Ein Wegweiser zur guten Mundart. With the participation of Eugen Dieth. Zürich (=und Wörterbücher des Schweizerdeutschen in allgemeinverständlicher Darstellung. Bd. I).  
 Weber, Albert and Bächtold, Jacques M.. Zürichdeutsches Wörterbuch. Zürich (=Grammatiken und Wörterbücher des Schweizerdeutschen in allgemeinverständlicher Darstellung. Bd. III).

References 

Canton of Zürich
Culture of Zürich
Swiss German language
German dialects